Mechanicville Jr./Sr. High School is a school located in Halfmoon, New York The school is part of the Mechanicville City School district and serves the district's sixth through 12th grades. In 2011, a merger occurred between the high school and the middle school causing the school to now be known as Mechanicville Jr./Sr. High School.

Activities and athletics
The school has golf, basketball, bowling, football, softball, baseball, soccer, volleyball, track, and cross-country teams.

Campus

Auditorium 
In the 1992–93 school year, Mechanicville High School opened the Paul Luther Memorial Auditorium. This facility seats 750 people.

2003 expansion 
Mechanicville High School opened a new gymnasium and a new library media center in the winter of 2003. During this time, a new chemistry and physics science lab was also built. The state-of-the-art lab allows students who take chemistry and physics the opportunity to participate in all the lab requirements mandated by the New York State Regents, as well as those recommended by various colleges and universities. This allows the students to gain valuable experience that will help them be successful at the college level. In September 2003, the Middle School portion occupied a new addition which houses a Science Lab, a Technology classroom complete with a video production area, a Family and Consumer Science suite along with three classrooms and a Middle School Cafeteria.

Indoor pool 
Mechanicville High School was one of the few schools in Upstate New York that had an indoor swimming pool for the community to enjoy. However, it was closed down in 2008 and in 2015–16 a new building project was granted to the school which renovated it into a café. When the pool was in use its dimension were 75×25 feet and had four lanes.

Combination of schools 
Mechanicville High School combined their Middle School and High Schools into a Jr./Sr. High School under one principal.

Board of education
The Mechanicville school board governs the Senior/Middle High School. As of 2012, the President is Kim Dunn, the Vice-President is John Zacher, and the board members are John Bove, Pat Greenhall, Frank Grimaldi, Joseph Micklas, and Joseph Waldron.

Notable alumni 

 Orie Amodeo, musician and member of the Lawrence Welk orchestra
 Joe Cocozzo, retired NFL player
 Gordon A. Sheehan, cartoonist and animator

References

External links
Mechanicville City School District
Campus Map
Accountability and Overview Report
Comprehensive Information Report

Public high schools in New York (state)
Schools in Saratoga County, New York
Public middle schools in New York (state)